Let's Go! Dream Team Season 2 is an organized sports variety program that airs on KBS2. The first episode aired on June 25, 2009 and the last one on May 29, 2016. The pilot episode was aired on September 13, 2009 titled as Let's Go Dream Team 2 - Green Team Go!. The first season of Dream Team was aired for six years between 1999 and 2003. Production director, Jeon Jin Hak, and MC, Lee Chang Myung, from season 1 were invited and returned to record for season 2.

Slogan
Opening: "The legend of ten years! A split second win!" (10년의 신화! 1초의 승부!)
Ending: "To build a society where everyone does his or her best and accepts the results as they are!" (승리를 위해 최선을 다하고 결과에 승복할 줄 하는 사회를 만들기 위해!)

Production
Main producer: Jeon Jin Hak
Current producers: Kwon Yong Taek, Lee Dong Hoon, Kim Sung Min
Past producers: Kim Jin Hwan, Lee Tae Heon
Current screenwriters: Kim Ki Ryun, Yoon Young Kyeong, Lee Hyo Jung, Kim Hye Jung, Ju Ri Ra, Baek Ju Yeon
Past screenwriters: Park Mi Kyeong, Kang Eun Ji, Im Ju Ri
FD: Shin Ji Woong, Kim Hye Jin
Voice: Lee Won Joon
Dream Team Main Doctor: Yoon Hyun Seok (episode 1-103), Jeon Byeong Chul (104-current)

Team/cast
MC: Lee Chang Myung, Boom
Commentators: Lee Byeong Jin, Yoo Ji Cheol
Fixed cast: Ricky Kim,  Choi Seong Jo, Shorry (Mighty Mouth), Park Jae Min, Agia
Semi-fixed cast: Kim Byung-man, Kwon Tae-Ho (Kwon Hyuk), Lee Hyun (8Eight), Heo Kyung Hwan, Lee Sang Ho, Lee Sang Min, Lee Seung Yoon, Kim Dong Jun (ZE:A), Park Jae Min, Lee Ju Hyeon, Kim Dong Sung, Lee Sang Hoon (100% (band)), Jeong Jinwoon (2AM)
Past cast: Jo Sungmo, Eun Hyuk (Super Junior), Danny Ahn, Sangchu (Mighty Mouth), Jung Suk-won, Lee Junho (2PM),  Hwang Chansung (2PM), Minho, Taemin (Shinee)

Format

Audience service game
Before the main event, the cast will play an audience service game to show their appreciation of the fans coming out to the event. The members choose a partner, which is usually their manager, but they can also choose a staff member, the team's doctor (2), or an audience. The game is usually played between the Dream Team members but can also be the opposing team. The losing team will pay for the snacks. However, sometimes they continue the game until one member of the losing team is finally chosen to pay. The loser of the game will pay for all the snack expenses.

Wildcard
Before the main event, each team will have a member participate at each obstacle. The winning team with fastest time and fewest eliminations will receive three wildcards, while the other team will receive two wildcards. If both teams have the same number of eliminations, then the team with the fastest time will receive three wildcards.

List of episodes

Main event stats

Individual stats

Men (Dream Team)

Women (Dream Team)

Men (opposing team)

See also
List of Let's Go! Dream Team Season 2 episodes

References

External links
 
 

Korean Broadcasting System original programming
South Korean variety television shows
2009 South Korean television seasons
Korean-language television shows